Axis 2 may refer to: 

 Apache Axis2, software for Web services
 Axis II (psychiatry), a class of psychiatric disorders